Derbyshire County Cricket Club in 1988 was the cricket season when the English club Derbyshire had been playing for one hundred and eighteen years. They reached the final of the Benson & Hedges Cup and reached the quarter-finals in the National Westminster Bank Trophy.  In the County Championship, they won four matches to finish fifteenth in their eighty-second season in the Championship. They came twelfth in the Refuge Assurance League

1988 season

Derbyshire played twenty two matches in the County Championship one against Cambridge University and one against the touring Sri Lankans. They won five first class matches overall and four in the championship. They won five and lost eight matches in the Sunday league.
  
Kim Barnett was in his third season as captain and was top scorer. Michael Holding took most wickets overall although Devon Malcolm who hardly figured in the one-day game took most wickets in the Championship.

Matches

First Class
{| class="wikitable" width="100%"
! bgcolor="#efefef" colspan=6 | List of matches
|- bgcolor="#efefef"
!No.
!Date
!V
!Result 
!Margin
!Notes
  |- 
|1 
| 16 Apr 1988
| Cambridge University FP Fenner's Ground, Cambridge 
|bgcolor="#00FF00"|Won
| Innings and 214 runs
|    KJ Barnett 151; PD Bowler 155 
|- 
|2
 |21 Apr 1988
| Leicestershire County Ground, Derby 
|bgcolor="#FFCC00"|Drawn
|
|    BJM Maher 121; Whittaker 145; Potter 107; Lewis 5-73 
|- 
|3
 |28 Apr 1988 
| Yorkshire Headingley, Leeds  
|bgcolor="#00FF00"|Won
| 5 wickets
|    Jarvis 5-49; PG Newman 8-29 
|- 
|4
 |5 May 1988  
 | Essex  <small> Queen's Park, Chesterfield 
|bgcolor="#FFCC00"|Drawn
|
|    Border 169; PD Bowler 159; Topley 7-75 and 5-104
|- 
|5
| 21 May 1988
 | Glamorgan   St Helen's, Swansea 
|bgcolor="#FFCC00"|Drawn
|
|    JE Morris 175 
|- 
|6
 |28 May 1988  
| Nottinghamshire  County Ground, Derby 
|bgcolor="#FFCC00"|Drawn
|
|    Stephenson 6-54 and 6-59; OH Mortensen 5-14 
|- 
|7
 | 4 Jun 1988  
|  Sussex   Cricket Field Road Ground, Horsham
|bgcolor="#00FF00"|Won
| 1 wicket
|    DE Malcolm 5-52 
|- 
|8
 |11 Jun 1988   
|  Gloucestershire  County Ground, Derby  
|bgcolor="#FF0000"|Lost
| 4 wickets
|    KJ Barnett 175; Wright 136; Curran 6-103 and 6-59 
|- 
|9
 |18 Jun 1988
|  Worcestershire County Ground, Derby 
|bgcolor="#FFCC00"|Drawn
|
|    Neale 125; Rhodes 108; 
|- 
|10
 |25 Jun 1988 
|  Surrey Kennington Oval   
|bgcolor="#FFCC00"|Drawn
|
|    PD Bowler 158 
|- 
|11
 |2 Jul 1988  
| Middlesex    County Ground, Derby 
|bgcolor="#FFCC00"|Drawn
|
|    OH Mortensen 6-35 
|- 
|12
 |13 Jul 1988  
 | Essex   Southchurch Park, Southend-on-Sea 
|bgcolor="#FF0000"|Lost
| 9 wickets
|    KJ Barnett 99; Foster 6-96 
|- 
|13
 |16 Jul 1988
| Northamptonshire  County Ground, Derby 
|bgcolor="#00FF00"|Won
| 144 runs
|    OH Mortensen 5-28 
|- 
|14
 |20 Jul 1988
| Leicestershire Grace Road, Leicester 
|bgcolor="#FFCC00"|Drawn
|
|   KJ Barnett 239; Briers 125 
|- 
|15
 | 23 Jul 1988 
| Hampshire United Services Recreation Ground, Portsmouth   
|bgcolor="#FFCC00"|Drawn
|
|    Maru 5-69 
|- 
|16
|  30 Jul 1988  
| Warwickshire  County Ground, Derby
|bgcolor="#FFCC00"|Drawn
|
|    JG Wright 154; Merrick 6-29; DE Malcolm 6-68 
|- 
|17
 | 6 Aug 1988  
| SomersetClarence Park, Weston-super-Mare
|bgcolor="#00FF00"|Won
| 183 runs
|     
|- 
|18
 | 13 Aug 1988  
| Kent  Queen's Park, Chesterfield 
|bgcolor="#FFCC00"|Drawn
|
|    Tavare 119; Cowdrey 108 
|- 
|19
 |17 Aug 1988 
| Yorkshire Queen's Park, Chesterfield  
|bgcolor="#FFCC00"|Drawn
|
|    Metcalfe 115; KJ Barnett 109 
|- 
|20
 |20 Aug 1988
 | Lancashire  Old Trafford, Manchester   
|bgcolor="#FFCC00"|Drawn
|
|    Atherton 115; Watkinson 6-50 
|- 
|21
 | 25 Aug 1988
| Northamptonshire <small> County Ground, Northampton
|bgcolor="#FFCC00"|Drawn
|
|    Bailey 110; OH Mortensen 6-40 
|- 
|22
 | 31 Aug 1988
| Sri Lanka  County Ground, Derby 
|bgcolor="#FFCC00"|Drawn
|
|     
|- 
|23
 |9 Sep 1988
| Nottinghamshire  Trent Bridge, Nottingham  
|bgcolor="#FF0000"|Lost
| Innings and 41 runs
|    JE Morris 106; Newell 105; Randall 237; Stephenson 5-91 
|- 
|24
 |14 Sep 1988
 | Lancashire  County Ground, Derby  
|bgcolor="#FFCC00"|Drawn
|
|    KJ Barnett 157; Fowler 172; Hayhurst 107; PD Bowler 134 
|-

Refuge Assurance League 
{| class="wikitable" width="70%"
! bgcolor="#efefef" colspan=6 | List of matches
|- bgcolor="#efefef"
!No.
!Date
!V
!Result 
!Margin
!Notes
  |- 
|1
|24 Apr 1988
| Leicestershire County Ground, Derby 
|bgcolor="#00FF00"|Won
| 9 wickets
|     
|- 
|2
 |1 May 1988 
| Yorkshire Headingley, Leeds  
|bgcolor="#FFCC00"|No Result
|
|     
|- 
|3
|8 May 1988  
| Essex   County Ground, Derby  
|bgcolor="#FF0000"|Lost
| 59 runs
|    Topley 5-25 
|- 
|4
|22 May 1988
 | Glamorgan   Rodney Parade, Newport 
|bgcolor="#FF0000"|Lost
| 25 runs
|     
|- 
|5
 |29 May 1988  
| Nottinghamshire  County Ground, Derby 
|bgcolor="#00FF00"|Won
| 9 wickets
|     
|- 
|6
 |5 Jun 1988  
|  Sussex   Cricket Field Road Ground, Horsham  
|bgcolor="#00FF00"|Won
| 5 runs
|     
|- 
|7
| 12 Jun 1988   
|  Gloucestershire  Town Ground, Heanor 
|bgcolor="#FF0000"|Lost
| 42 runs
|     
|- 
|8
 |19 Jun 1988
|  Worcestershire Victora and Knypersley Social Welfare Centre, Knypersley 
|bgcolor="#FF0000"|Lost
| 69 runs
|     
|- 
|9
|26 Jun 1988 
|  Surrey Kennington Oval  
|bgcolor="#FFCC00"|Tied
|
|     
|- 
|10
| 3 Jul 1988  
| Middlesex    Repton School Ground 
|bgcolor="#FFCC00"|No Result
|
|     
|- 
|11
 |24 Jul 1988 
| Hampshire United Services Recreation Ground, Portsmouth   
|bgcolor="#FF0000"|Lost
| 4 wickets
|    Bakker 5-26 
|- 
|12
 |31 Jul 1988  
| Warwickshire  County Ground, Derby
|bgcolor="#FF0000"|Lost
| 8 runs
|     
|- 
|13
 |7 Aug 1988  
| SomersetClarence Park, Weston-super-Mare
|bgcolor="#00FF00"|Won
| 2 runs
|     
|- 
|14
 |14 Aug 1988  
| Kent  Queen's Park, Chesterfield 
|bgcolor="#FF0000"|Lost
| 6 wickets
|     
|- 
|15
 |21 Aug 1988
 | Lancashire  Old Trafford, Manchester   
|bgcolor="#FF0000"|Lost
| 2 runs
|     
|- 
|16
| 28 Aug 1988
| Northamptonshire  County Ground, Northampton
|bgcolor="#00FF00"|Won
| 5 runs
|     
|-

National Westminster Bank Trophy 
{| class="wikitable" width="70%"
! bgcolor="#efefef" colspan=6 | List of matches
|- bgcolor="#efefef"
!No.
!Date
!V
!Result 
!Margin
!Notes
 |- 
|1st Round
| 22 Jun 1988  
|  Sussex   County Ground, Hove  
|bgcolor="#00FF00"|Won
| 6 wickets
|    MA Holding 8-21 
|- 
|2nd Round
| 25 Jun 1988
 | CheshireBoughton Hall Cricket Club Ground, Chester  
|bgcolor="#00FF00"|Won
| 87 runs
|    OH Mortensen 5-15 
|- 
| Quarter Final
| 27 Jul 1988
| Hampshire County Ground, Derby 
|bgcolor="#FF0000"|Lost
| 4 wickets
|

Benson and Hedges Cup
 {| class="wikitable" width="60%"
! bgcolor="#efefef" colspan=6 | List of matches
|- bgcolor="#efefef"
!No.
!Date
!V
!Result 
!Margin
!Notes
|-
| Group A 1
 | 26 Apr 1988
| Scotland  Hamilton Crescent, Glasgow 
 |bgcolor="#00FF00"|Won
| 7 wickets
|     
|- 
| Group A 2
 | 3 May 1988
| Warwickshire  County Ground, Derby 
|bgcolor="#FFCC00"|No Result
|
|     
|- 
| Group A 3
 |10 May 1988 
| Lancashire  Aigburth, Liverpool 
|bgcolor="#00FF00"|Won
| 5 wickets
|     
|- 
| Group A 4
 |14 May 1988
|Leicestershire County Ground, Derby 
|bgcolor="#00FF00"|Won
| 6 wickets
|     
|- 
| Quarter Final
 | 25 May 1988
| Middlesex    County Ground, Derby 
|bgcolor="#00FF00"|Won
| 9 wickets
|    DE Malcolm 5-27 
|- 
| Semi Final
 |  8 Jun 1988
 | Glamorgan   St Helen's, Swansea  
|bgcolor="#00FF00"|Won
| 14 runs
|    MA Holding 5-31 
|- 
|  Final
 |  9 Jul 1988
| Hampshire Lord's Cricket Ground, St John's Wood 
|bgcolor="#FF0000"|Lost
| 7 wickets
|    Jeffries 5-13 
|-

Statistics

Competition batting averages

Competition bowling averages

Wicket Keeping
Bernie Maher
County Championship Catches 51, Stumping 1
Refuge Assurance League Catches 13, Stumping 2
National Westminster Trophy Catches 9, Stumping 0
Benson and Hedges Cup Catches 9, Stumping 0

See also
Derbyshire County Cricket Club seasons
1988 English cricket season

References

1988 in English cricket
Derbyshire County Cricket Club seasons